Ville-d'Avray is a commune in the western suburbs of Paris, France. The commune is part of the arrondissement of Boulogne-Billancourt in the Hauts-de-Seine department. In 2019, it had a population of 11,225.

Demographics

Transport
Ville-d'Avray contains a suburban rail line station called Sèvres – Ville d'Avray station on the Transilien Paris-Saint-Lazare suburban rail line. This station is an 800-meter walk from the residential area of Ville-d'Avray.

Personalities
Jean Rostand was a French experimental biologist and philosopher who lived in Ville-d'Avray. He became famous for his work as a science writer, as well as a philosopher and an activist. His scientific work covered a variety of biological fields such as amphibian embryology, parthenogenesis and teratogeny, while his literary output extended into popular science, history of science and philosophy. His work in the area of cryogenics gave the idea of cryonics to Robert Ettinger.

The famous beauty and Scottish courtesan Grace Elliott died in Ville-d'Avray in May 1823. Landscape painter Jean-Baptiste-Camille Corot maintained a residence in the village and used the area as a subject for several paintings including Ville-d'Avray in 1867. Actress Isabelle Huppert spent her childhood in Ville-d'Avray. French author and musician Boris Vian was born in the town in 1920. Literary historian and critic, essayist, novelist and poet, member of the Académie Française and the Académie de Saintonge, Pierre-Henri Simon lived in Ville d'Avray and is buried there.

Famous 19th century courtesan Valtesse de La Bigne had a second home here which was next door to the home of famous French politician Léon Gambetta.

Popularity on Google Earth
The village is the location of a former technical school focused on the aerospace sector, though now associated with the University of Paris. To celebrate their ongoing commitment to aeronautical engineering, a scale model of a Dassault Mirage 2000 fighter jet is set out in the courtyard. Discovery of the model by users of Google Earth in the mid-2000s caused a minor stir on the Internet, and the "jet in a residential parking lot" is consistently featured on lists of satellite imagery curiosities.

Education
Primary schools in the commune:
 Groupe scolaire Jean Rostand
 Groupe scolaire La Ronce
 Maternelle Halphen (preschool)

Collège La Fontaine du Roy is within the commune.

It is served by the public high school Lycée Jean Pierre Vernant in Sèvres.

See also
 Sundays and Cybele
Communes of the Hauts-de-Seine department
 List of works by James Pradier Sculptures in parish church

References

External links
 Ville-d'Avray town council website (in French)

Communes of Hauts-de-Seine